Leanne Black (previously Miller) is a fictional character on the New Zealand soap opera Shortland Street who was portrayed by Jennifer Ludlam. Leanne debuted as the mother of established character Nicole Miller (Sally Martin) in a guest role in 2010, before reprising the role in more central positions in both 2011 and 2014.

Creation and casting
The character of Leanne was created as the mother of established character Nicole Miller (Sally Martin) in a storyline that saw her come out as bisexual to her family and reveal her relationship with Maia Jeffries (Anna Jullienne). Jennifer Ludlam was offered the role due to what she believed as, "being a certain age, and looking like I could pass for Nicole's mother." Leanne debuted onscreen in April 2010 and Ludlam enjoyed shooting the show due to the outspoken nature of her character. Ludlam was offered a reprisal of the role the following year and she appeared for 5 weeks in recurring role. She made her last appearance on 25 February 2011. Ludlam was offered to reprise the role 3 years later and agreed upon learning she was going to have, "my own arc and be a person." Leanne returned in March 2014, in a more central role that saw her become the receptionist at the hospital. Ludlam found it daunting filming at the reception desk due to its "iconic" nature and having worked with several former actors who played the receptionist role such as Elizabeth McRae (Marj Brasch), Geraldine Brophy (Moira Crombie) and Alison Quigan (Yvonne Jeffries). Ludlam was pleased how the character had developed following her 2014 return, "I feel very lucky. I came in for 6 months because I looked like I could play Sally Martin's mother and then years later I am still here and the writers have - and this is fantastic - have really started writing for me.". From 2021 onwards, Leanne was no longer a core cast member. She appears on a recurring basis.

Storylines
In late 2009 Nicole Miller (Sally Martin) informed recently discovered half sister Morgan Braithwaite (Bonnie Soper) that her family were eager to meet her, primarily her mother, Leanne. Several months after Morgan's untimely death, Nicole's ex-girlfriend Maia Jeffries (Anna Jullienne) and Gerald Tippett (Harry McNaughton) visited Tauranga to find a recently runaway Nicole and ended up staying at Leanne's house. Nicole and Maia were forced to keep their relationship private due to Leanne's conservative nature but when Nicole eventually came out, Leanne disowned her unless she dumped Maia permanently. Nicole at first accepted but later fled Tauranga and reunited with Maia in Ferndale. The following year Leanne arrived in Ferndale and pronounced her new pro-gay attitude, showing open approval of Nicole and Maia's relationship. However, after discovering Maia had cheated on Nicole, Leanne set about sabotaging the two and tried to set Nicole up with both Hunter McKay (Lee Donoghue) and Maxwell Avia (Robbie Magasiva). Whilst out for a walk, Leanne was mugged and injured, extending her stay in Ferndale that eventually saw her receive a job as the hospital receptionist. However Leanne soon realised she was holding Nicole back from a relationship and returned to Tauranga.

In 2012 Nicole visited Leanne after her brother Eric (Mick Andrews) had a severe schizophrenic episode. In 2014 Nicole and Vinnie Kruse (Pua Magasiva) returned to Tauranga after Leanne requested help with Eric once again. However, when Nicole suggested Leanne was the issue, she kicked her out only to show up in Ferndale with Eric. Following Eric being sent into care, Leanne made it clear that she thought Nicole should date Vinnie over girlfriend Harper Whitley (Ria Vandervis). She returned to her role as receptionist at the hospital having sold her house in Tauranga. Leanne had a brief flirtation with Murray Cooper (Matthew Chamberlain) after mistakingly believing he and his wife Wendy (Jacqueline Nairn) were swingers. She began to date Nev Carlson (Stuart Devenie) much to the angst of Nicole, but he left her for one of his five ex-wives. Leanne soon found herself becoming a burden to her family but this changed when she began to date Howard Black (Michael Saccente) who lavished her in expensive gifts. Though it soon turned out he had a potentially terminal illness and he returned to America, with Leanne nearly joining him on the day of Nicole's wedding. In 2016 Leanne began to feel elderly and underwent plastic surgery only for the anaesthetic not to work, leading to her being awake during the aborted procedure. Feeling increasingly unwanted at work, Leanne was overjoyed when Howard returned to Ferndale. The two decided to marry and after realising how much she needed to move on, she left Ferndale. Three months later, Leanne returned to Ferndale temporarily after her honeymoon with Howard although it soon turned out he had fallen overboard of the cruise ship and had drowned.

After Howard's death, she has had 3 relationship stints with Damo Johnson, and also worked 2 stints and PA to Chris Warner (current), and a stint as triage receptionist.

In 2019, Leanne's long lost son Eddie was reunited with her (Rawiri Jobe), this came as a shock to Leanne because she was unsure how he will react as Leanne wasn't there for Eddie growing up. In September 2019, Willy Marsh (Jim Moriarty) who was Leanne's past Ex and Eddie's dad Shocked Eddie and Leanne with a surprise visit. Damo Johnson was concerned that Leanne might get to close to Willy. After spending days together Leanne and Willy were getting closer together. And while Willy was at Leanne's apartment they had Kissed. Leanne couldn't keep it a secret so she had to tell Damo. He was upset but he forgave her. Damo said to Leanne that she must stay away from him. But Damo then caught Leanne and Willy at the I.V together. Leanne was tempted to go upstairs with him, until Damo found them and heard what they were saying. Damo told other friends that him and Leanne are over. But Dawn (Rebekah Palmer) convinced Damo into giving Leanne one more chance. So he went back to their apartment and forgave Leanne one last time until Leanne said that they are over. Little did Damo know that Willy was upstairs in their apartment packing to go away with Leanne. Damo was upset and that was the last of their relationship together. Leanne and Willy left Ferndale in September 2019 to start a new life together. She bid farewell to Nicole and grandson Pele, and to Damo, leaving him heartbroken.

In January 2020, Leanne returned to Shortland Street.

Reception
Ludlam highly enjoyed portraying Leanne throughout her first stint as she liked the extremities of Leanne's homophobia and believed it provided an interesting character to play. However upon her second stint that saw Leanne accepting towards Nicole and Maia's relationship, Ludlam believed that the character had been toned down and found portraying the character to be "a lot less fun". Leanne's mispronunciation of Ula Levi's (Frankie Adams) name as "Ew-la" became a running joke throughout the cast and crew, with a 2015 scene showing Ula correcting her after many months, receiving much praise by the audience. Karima Madut praised the relationship between Leanne and her character fellow receptionist Clementine Dean, "They are a great team, I guess Leanne is more the older, wiser woman and they develop a great relationship. My character looks up to her and she learns to not become more subdued, but she starts to become more thoughtful." The character proved hugely controversial upon her debut April 2010 after several homophobic comments she made were perceived to be insulting the city of Tauranga in suggesting it was not gay friendly. The controversy surrounded Leanne telling Gerald Tippett (Harry McNaughton) that his shirt was "too gay" for Tauranga. The episode also featured Nicole referring to the city as not being as gay friendly as Auckland. Bay of Plenty Tourism general manager, Tim Burgess believed the show was establishing a "negative stereotype," and that the, "only positive thing I can say is they were pronouncing Tauranga and Mauao correctly." In response to the episode he referred to the writing team as "disappointing and lazy." Burgess also requested an apology. Matthew Denton of the University of Auckland student magazine, Craccum, named Leanne as the shows 5th most annoying character. He attributed this to her blatant homophobia and the irony of this due to her disregard for relationships after attempting to seduce married man Murray Cooper (Matthew Chamberlain). Leanne's homophobia again drew controversy in 2017, with a stuff.co.nz columnist believing it was sending the wrong message to young watchers. Tara Strong of The Spinoff website praised Leanne and Howard's romance and compared them to Prince Charles and Camilla, Duchess of Cornwall. She believed their wedding episode was a "perfect" exit for the character.

References

Shortland Street characters
Television characters introduced in 2010
Fictional receptionists
Female characters in television